"Fear of a Blank Planet" is a Porcupine Tree song released in 2007. It appears as the first track on the album of the same name.

A promo single of the song was released in Europe and the United States, by respective record labels. Both promos contain an edited version of "Fear of a Blank Planet" with the swearing removed. The lyrics deal with two common neurobehavioural developmental disorders for teenagers in the 21st century: bipolar disorder and attention deficit disorder.

Music video
On 16 April 2007, the same day as the European release date, the music video for the title track debuted on Porcupine Tree's MySpace, though it was temporarily removed a day later in the wake of the shootings at Virginia Tech due to the band finding the content, namely children wielding guns, distasteful at the present. On 25 April 2007, the video was launched on the Fear of a Blank Planet microsite to view in high resolution and was replaced several months later by the live projection for "Sleep Together". The video is now included as a bonus along with the 17-minute film for "Anesthetize" on the DVD-A version of Fear of a Blank Planet.

Appearances
The song appears during the end credits of the video game Control.

Track listing

Personnel
Porcupine Tree
Steven Wilson – vocals, guitar
Richard Barbieri – keyboards
Colin Edwin – bass
Gavin Harrison – drums

Additional musicians
John Wesley – backing vocals

References

2007 songs
Bipolar disorder in fiction
Porcupine Tree songs
Songs about mental health
Songs written by Steven Wilson